Ityadi is a popular magazine television programme in Bangladesh created and presented by Hanif Sanket that airs on Bangladesh Television.  It is the longest running show on Bangladeshi television and also the longest-running magazine show in the world . It is a satire entertainment program being shown in Bangladesh Television for the last 34 years. Regular segments of the show include 
Nana-Naati (formerly) / Nani-Naati, Mama-Bhagne , Haba Hashmot (formerly), a foreign filmstrip dubbed in Bengali (formerly), country history, a mail section, a segment where Foreigners act as Bangladeshis and represent Bangladeshi Culture, a quiz round for audiences, live music, dance, and plays. Ityadi also helps to promote Bengali Culture among the young generations in age of cultural diversity due to globalization. It also brings many intellectual persons in music, drama or education into light.

References

External links
 Official youtube channel of Ittyadi.

1980s Bangladeshi television series
1990s Bangladeshi television series
2000s Bangladeshi television series
2010s Bangladeshi television series
Bangladeshi variety television shows
Bengali-language television programming in Bangladesh
2020s Bangladeshi television series
Bangladesh Television original programming